Norwalk High School is a college-preparatory high school in Norwalk, California.  It is a member school of the Norwalk-La Mirada Unified School District. It was established in 1956. Norwalk High School is fully accredited by the Western Associations of Schools and Colleges. It is certified to award a traditional American high school diploma. English is the main language of instruction. The current principal is David Olea.

History
The school was established in 1956. In the 2006-2007 school year, the school celebrated its 50th anniversary. As of 2014-15, the average class size 29.3 students.

Curriculum
Norwalk High School follows the University of California & California State University's 4-years college-prep curriculum. Norwalk High School also divides into specialized programs: PLTW Biomedical Engineering, PLTW Computer Science, PLTW Engineering, Advanced Placement, Medical Academy, LA Fame (visual and performing arts), Gifted and Talented Education, English as Second Language Support, Seal of Biliteracy and Special Education.

The school offers various Advanced Placement courses. It is an examination center for the SAT, ACT, AP exams and other college-requirement tests. In addition to American high school diploma, Norwalk High School is authorized to award the Seal of Biliteracy, a seal certified to students who have proficiency in English and other foreign languages. The school offers an English as Second Language program for students who need additional support with English.

Extracurricular activities
Norwalk High School has many clubs and activities for students.  The following list should not be considered exhaustive: Associated Student Body, Marching Band, Concert Band, Wind Ensemble, Jazz Band, Choir/Sing Club, Bible Club, The Voice Newspaper, Yearbook Club, French Club, California Scholarship Federation, Key Club, Academic Decathlon, Shared Decision Making Council, Art Club, AVID Club, Millennium Club, Culinary Club, Dance Club, Debate Club, Film Club, Interact Club, MECHA Club, Spanish Club, Theatrics Club, Women Empowerment Club, Green Team, and First Aid Club.  Students participate in these clubs, which might sometimes include a component of volunteer work.

Besides clubs, some students participate in athletics, which include Cross Country, Soccer, Football, Softball, Baseball, Tennis, Track and Field, Wrestling, Basketball and Volleyball.

Notable alumni
 Jim York (class of 1965)  pitcher for Kansas City Royals, Houston Astros, and New York Yankees
 Bob Kevoian (class of 1969)  radio host, The Bob & Tom Show
 Elijhaa Penny (class of 2011)  fullback for the New York Giants
 Rashaad Penny (class of 2014)  running back for the Seattle Seahawks
 Gene Taylor (class of 1970)  musician, acclaimed blues-rock and boogie-woogie pianist
 Tiffany Darwish (singer) (freshman and sophomore years only, circa 1986/87)

References

External links

Norwalk High School website

High schools in Los Angeles County, California
Public high schools in California
Norwalk, California
Educational institutions established in 1956
1956 establishments in California